The Battle of Loulan (樓蘭之戰) in 108 BC marks the earliest Chinese military venture into Central Asia, after a conflict of the Han Dynasty with Loulan and Jushi and a switch of allegiance to the Xiongnu. The Han launched an attack by first arresting the king of Loulan, and turned on the offense against Jushi. The battle resulted in the submission of both Wusun and Dayuan, and an increased role, reputation, and status for imperial Han Chinese politics in Central Asia.

Aftermath
The Loulan kingdom ceased to exist in 77 BC, as the last king of Loulan, Angui, was assassinated by two of Fu Jiezi's men during a banquet. The Han deposited one of his kin, Weituyan. They also changed the name Loulan to Shanshan in the same year, as the capital was moved south west to the city of Wuni (which was no longer situated in the Lop Nur).

References
Ban Gu et al., Hanshu. Beijing: Zhonghua Shuju, 1962. 
Sima Guang, comp. Zizhi Tongjian. Beijing: Zhonghua Shuju, 1956. 

108 BC
Loulan 108 BC
Loulan 108 BC
2nd century BC in China
History of Xinjiang